"The Little Wonders" is the sixteenth episode of the third series of the 1960s cult British spy-fi television series The Avengers, starring Patrick Macnee and Honor Blackman. It was first broadcast by ABC on 11 January 1964. The episode was directed by Laurence Bourne and written by Eric Paice.

Plot
Steed and Cathy infiltrate a crime syndicate whose members masquerade as members of the clergy.

Cast
 Patrick Macnee as John Steed
 Honor Blackman as Cathy Gale
 Kenneth J. Warren as Fingers, a.k.a. The Frog, Vicar of Toowoomba
 David Bauer as Bishop of Winnipeg 
 Lois Maxwell as Sister Johnson 
 Tony Steedman as Dr. A.S. Beardmore 
 Harry Landis  as Harry, a.k.a. Archdeacon of Bangkok 
 John Cowley as Big Sid, a.k.a. Dean of Rangoon 
 Rosemarie Dunham as Gerda 
 Frank Maher as Hasek 
 Alex MacDonald as Porter 
 Mark Heath as Coalman, a.k.a. Rev. Garfield Percival 
 Christopher Robbie as Thug 
 Rick Jones as Thug

References

External links

Episode overview on The Avengers Forever! website

The Avengers (season 3) episodes
1964 British television episodes